Macina Cercle is an administrative subdivision of the Ségou Region of Mali. The administrative center (chef-lieu) is the town of Macina.

The cercle is divided into 11 communes:
Boky Wéré
Folomana
Kokry
Kolongo
Macina
Matomo
Monimpébougou
Saloba
Sana
Souleye
Tongué

References

Cercles of Mali
Ségou Region